Live... And Kickin' is a 1997 live album by George Clinton and the P-Funk All-Stars. The album was released by the Intersound Label in the U.S. and by Victor Entertainment Inc. in Japan. The release is a double CD set containing tracks recorded during various P-Funk tours dating back to 1978, as well as three studio tracks including a collaboration with the Dazz Band. The Japanese version of Live... And Kickin was scaled back to a single CD release.

Track listingCD-1Cosmic Slop (7:39)
Bop Gun (6:28)
Standing On The Verge (9:07)
Funk Gettin' Ready To Roll (3:59)
Funkentelechy (Where'd You Get That Funk From) (24:14)
Give Up The Funk (Tear The Roof Off The Sucker) (9:42)
Let's Take It To The Stage (5:18)
Good Love (Instrumental) (5:57)CD-2'

Maggot Brain (8:26)
Make My Funk The P-Funk (12:27)
Flashlight (7:14)
Aqua Boogie (6:19)
Atomic Dog (8:28)
The Mothership Connection (16:44)
Pepe The Pill Popper (3:39)
Let's Get Satisfied / Dope Dog (3:52)
Ain't Nuthin' But A Jam Y'All (4:01)
State Of The Nation (5:23)

George Clinton (funk musician) albums
1997 live albums